Peter Proksch (4 February 1935 – 9 December 2012) was an Austrian artist.

Born in Vienna, he was the eldest of four children. The father Alfred Proksch was a commercial artist, the mother was a model. The profession of the father, obviously stimulated his talent and the interest in drawing very early, even if this, in the years of war, seldom, if ever, could be with his family. Also because of the war, the family left Vienna to live in the country until the end of war.

Education and training
Returned to Vienna in 1945, he attended secondary school. From 1950 to 1955 he studied graphic design at the Graphische Lehr- und Versuchsanstalt, Vienna, where he graduated obtaining the masters diploma. As he took a minor interest in the profession of a graphic designer, he continues, studying painting, at the academy of fine arts in Vienna, at first at the masters class of R.C.Anderen where from he soon changes to the masters class of Sergius Pauser.

There he had the possibility to learn the classical technique of the old masters. After another year of studying at the class of Chr.L.Martin (artistic printing methods) to learn the art of etching, he completed his studies in 1962. That year, he exhibited some etchings for the first time. The first personal exhibition followed in 1963. It was not a great success, but the results were contacts to galleries, art dealers, collectors and subsequently, possibilities to exhibit all over the world. Today Peter Proksch is known as one of the most famous representatives of the Viennese Fantastic Art. Exhibitions in Paris, Rome, Turin, Munich, Cologne, Düsseldorf, Basel, Vaduz, Tokyo, New York, Tel Aviv, Caracas and last but not least in Vienna, made his work recognized all over the world and you can find them in many public and private collections."

Exhibitions

 1962 Silver Rose Gallery, Vienna
 1963 VII Biennial of São Paulo
 1964 Künstlerhaus, Vienna
 1969 Touring Exhibition,Vienna School of Fantastic Realism
 San Francisco, Austin, Fort Worth,Hollywood, Louisville, Madison, Nashville,Indianapolis, Tampa, Washington, New York,
 Philadelphia, Boston, Detroit, Chicago.
 1970 Braith-Mali-Museum Biberach
 1971 Type 2'71, Basel
 1971 Museum of Applied Arts, Vienna
 1976 David Findlay Galleries in New York
 1980 Künstlerhaus, Vienna
 1981 National Gallery, Klagenfurt
 1982 Secession, Vienna
 1983 Upper House Museum, Passau
 1984 Art Cologne, Cologne
 1985 Wilhelm Hack Museum, Ludwigshafen
 1988 Metropolitan Museum Simeonstift, Trier
 1988 Künstlerhaus Nuremberg, Nuremberg
 1989 Art Cologne, Cologne
 1995 Sotheby Palace, Vienna
 1995 Cathedral Gallery, Wiener Neustadt
 1996 Gallery Corso, Vienna
 2003 Gloria Gallery, Vienna
 2003 Egon-Schiele-Museum Tulln
 2007 Museum of Fantastic Art, Brussels
 2009 Foundation Schlotter, Altea

References

 Gustav René Hocke: New myths in modern times. Belvedere Press, Vienna 1979,  (ISBN formally incorrect 3-900175-21-0).
 Alexander Giese : Peter Proksch. Paintings, drawings, gouaches of 1957 to 1990. Amalthea Verlag, Vienna / Munich 1991,  .
 Alexander Giese: pictures except the time. Amalthea Verlag, Vienna / Munich 1991st.
 https://archive.today/20130114234700/http://www.kunst-kontra-tierversuche.at/bi_proksch_peter.php

1935 births
2012 deaths
Artists from Vienna
Austrian etchers